Hypodoxa paroptila is a moth of the family Geometridae first described by Alfred Jefferis Turner in 1906. It is found in Australia, including Queensland.

References

Moths described in 1906
Pseudoterpnini